Platycheirus tarsalis is a species of hoverfly. It is found in many parts of Britain and Europe.

References

Syrphinae
Diptera of Europe
Insects described in 1837